Mal-e Khalifeh (also Romanized as Māl-e Khalīfeh and Māl Khalīfeh; also known as Deh-e Khalīfeh and Deh Khalīfa) is a city in Falard District of Lordegan County, Chaharmahal and Bakhtiari province, Iran. At the 2006 census, its population was 2,962 in 658 households. The following census in 2011 counted 3,698 people in 857 households. The latest census in 2016 showed a population of 4,024 people in 1,228 households. The city is populated by Lurs. The city is populated by Lurs.

References 

Lordegan County

Cities in Chaharmahal and Bakhtiari Province

Populated places in Chaharmahal and Bakhtiari Province

Populated places in Lordegan County

Luri settlements in Chaharmahal and Bakhtiari Province